Fabian Reese (born 29 November 1997) is a German professional footballer who plays as a striker for  club Holstein Kiel.

Club career
Reese began with the football in the youth of Holstein Kiel and joined 2013 the youth academy (Nachwuchsleistungszentrum) of Schalke 04. He made his debut in the professional football on 21 November 2015 on the 14th matchday of the 2015–16 Bundesliga against Bayern Munich in a 3–1 home defeat. He replaced Max Meyer after 87 minutes. On 16 February 2016, Reese signed his first professional contract of his young career which would run until 30 June 2019 with Schalke 04.

In January 2018, he joined 2. Bundesliga Greuther Fürth on loan until the end of the season.

Career statistics

References

External links
 

1997 births
Living people
Sportspeople from Kiel
Association football forwards
German footballers
Germany youth international footballers
Bundesliga players
2. Bundesliga players
FC Schalke 04 players
FC Schalke 04 II players
Karlsruher SC players
Holstein Kiel players
SpVgg Greuther Fürth players
Footballers from Schleswig-Holstein